The Coastal Brigade (RPR) is a brigade-level unit in the Finnish Navy. It is responsible for amphibious warfare, naval reconnaissance and special operations of the Finnish Navy. It is one of the three main units of the Navy, alongside the Coastal Fleet and Nyland Brigade.

Structure 
Headquarters
Porkkala Coastal Battalion
Support Company
Transport Company
Military Police Company
Materiel Centre
Suomenlinna Coastal Regiment
Anti-Ship Missile Battery
Communications Company
Coastal Company
Coastal Artillery Battery
Section Leader School
Naval Reconnaissance Battalion
Combat Diver School (EOD Diver, Combat Diver)
Special Operations Detachment
Naval Reconnaissance Company

References 

Naval units and formations of Finland
Brigades of Finland
Military units and formations established in 2015